Arsenije Sremac (Arsenius the Syrmian;  1219 – 1266) was the second Archbishop of the Serbian Orthodox Church (1233–1263) and a disciple of Saint Sava of Serbia.

Early life 
Arsenije was born in the village of Dabar, near Slankamen (today Stari Slankamen), at the time part of the Kingdom of Syrmia (modern Srem, Serbia). The exact date of his birth is unknown. He took monastic vows, probably in St. Demetrius Monastery in today's Sremska Mitrovica. When he heard of St. Sava's work, he was impressed and left for the monastery of Žiča. He soon became St. Sava's disciple and his synkellos. He was appointed as the ecclesiarch of the monastery and later Archimandrite of Žiča, because of his religious life.

When Serbia was invaded by Hungary, St. Sava sent St. Arsenius to find a safer place in the south to establish a new episcopal See. Arsenius chose Peć, where he built a monastery and a church which was at first dedicated to the Holy Apostles, and then to the Lord's Ascension.

Archbishop 

When St. Sava decided to abdicate, he decided that Arsenije would succeed him. Arsenije was consecrated bishop. He was able to continue in the work of his predecessor. He built Monastery of Peć and participated in the translation of St. Sava's sacred bones from Trnovo to the monastery of Mileševa. St. Arsenije crowned King Stefan Uroš I. He helped King Stefan Uroš I and Queen St. Helene in building the monasteries Sopoćani and Gradac.

He suffered a stroke in 1263, after which he was succeeded by Saint Sava II, nephew of Saint Sava. St. Arsenije died on October 28, 1266.

His relics were buried at the Pech monastery but now rest in the Ždrebaonik monastery in Montenegro. His feast day is celebrated according to the Orthodox liturgical calendar on October 28 (Julian Calendar, i.e. November 10 of the Gregorian Calendar).

See also
 List of Serbian saints

External links

Repose of St Arsenius, Archbishop of Serbia Orthodox icon and synaxarion

1266 deaths
13th-century Serbian people
13th-century Eastern Orthodox bishops
Archbishops of Serbs
Medieval Serbian Orthodox clergy
Eastern Orthodox Christians from Serbia
People from Inđija
Serbian saints of the Eastern Orthodox Church
Year of birth unknown
Saint Sava
Medieval Serbian Orthodox bishops
Burials at the Patriarchate of Peć (monastery)